Bel is both a surname and a given name. Notable people with the name include:

Given name
 Annabel Linquist, American artist, musician, and entrepreneur
 Bel Kaufman (1911–2014), American teacher and author, best known for writing the novel Up the Down Staircase
 Bel Mooney (born 1946), English journalist and broadcaster
 Bel Olid (born 1977), Spanish writer and translator
 Bel Powley (born 1992), British actress
 Bel Pozueta (born 1965), Basque politician

Surname

Bel / Bél
 Clyde F. Bel Jr. (c. 1932 – 2014), American politician
 Eógan Bél (died 542), a king of Connacht (in what is now Ireland)
 Matthias Bel (1684–1749), Hungarian scholar, polymath and Lutheran pastor
 Jules Bel (1842-1904), French cheese maker

Le Bel
 Jean Le Bel (c. 1290 – 1370), medieval Flemish chronicler
 Joseph Achille Le Bel (1847–1930), French chemist

Fictional characters
 Bel Arvardan, in Isaac Asimov's novel Pebble in the Sky
 Bel Riose, in Isaac Asimov's Foundation series
 Bel (Dungeons & Dragons), lord of the first of The Nine Hells, in Dungeons and Dragons games